Lumpia goreng is an Indonesian simple fried spring rolls filled with vegetables; the spring roll wrappers are filled with chopped carrots cut into matchstick size, shredded cabbage, and sometimes mushrooms. Although usually filled only with vegetables, the fried spring rolls might be enrichen with minced beef, chicken, or prawns.

In Indonesia, lumpia goreng usually associated as gorengan snack foods.

See also

 Cuisine of Indonesia
 List of Indonesian snacks
 Lumpia
 Lumpia semarang
 Sumpia
 Spring roll

References

Appetizers
Indonesian cuisine
Kue
Street food in Indonesia